"Livin' for Your Love (Your Love)" is a song recorded, written, and produced by the American electronic dance music duo Rosabel, featuring vocals by singer Jeanie Tracy. The underground garage-themed track reached number one on Billboard's Dance Club Songs chart in its July 30, 2016 issue, making it their sixth chart-topper, as well as their third with Tracy, who in turn picked up her fourth number one in total, all as a featured vocalist with production acts (the other being with the Brazilian act Altar with "Party People" in 2007).

Track listings
iTunes listing
 "Livin' for Your Love (Your Love)" [Rosabel Housed Radio Mix] 3:36  
 "Livin' for Your Love (Your Love)" [Rosabel Housed Club Mix] 6:28   
 "Livin' for Your Love (Your Love)" [Spiritchaser Club Mix] 6:36 
 "Livin' for Your Love (Your Love)" [Spiritlevel Dub Mix] 6:34  
 "Livin' for Your Love (Your Love)" [Rosabel & E Thunder Peak Dub] 6:53    
 "Livin' for Your Love (Your Love)" [Spiritchaser Club Instrumental]  6:36

References

External links
Official audio at YouTube

2016 songs
2016 singles
Rosabel songs